The University of Minnesota's Campus Shuttle is a zero-fare bus service operating on the University's Minneapolis and St. Paul (Falcon Heights) campuses.  In 2009, the system carried more than 3.9 million riders, making it the second-busiest transit system in Minnesota after the Twin Cities's primary provider Metro Transit.  It outpaces all of the suburban transit providers in the Twin Cities, as well as providers in other metropolitan areas in the state.  Duluth Transit Authority serving Duluth, Minnesota and Superior, Wisconsin is the state's third-busiest provider, while the Minnesota Valley Transit Authority ranks fourth.  The shuttles are operated under contract by First Transit through the University's Parking and Transportation Services (PTS) department.

System description
There are five regular routes in the system. Additionally, the University operates paratransit services and offers a shuttle route during game days at TCF Bank Stadium.

The system started running hybrid-electric buses in 2008.  As of 2010, the system's fleet is primarily composed of hybrid buses. The system also uses a handful of Van Hool European-styled BRT buses leased from the corporation as to not violate the Surface Transportation Assistance Act, which requires transit vehicles to be built in the United States.

During the school year on regular weekdays, the shuttles operate with schedule-less service as often as every five minutes.  In 2008, the system carried 3.55 million riders.  Despite the fact that the shuttle service is free, it is comparatively inexpensive to operate: with an operating cost of $4.55 million in 2008, the operating subsidy was only $1.28 per passenger.  For comparison, Metro Transit's busy Metro Blue Line required a subsidy of $1.44 that year, and that was with many riders paying $1.75 or more for a ride.

In 2010, Parking and Transportation Services received the annual Transit System of the Year award from the Minnesota Public Transit Association.

GopherTrip
GopherTrip is real-time information system that provides bus arrival information to assist in trip planning for the Campus Shuttle system. GopherTrip is available as a mobile app for iPhone and Android systems. Users can also text a stop number to 41411 and receive estimated arrival times for that stop. Certain stops on the system have audiovisual arrival boards. Since buses do not operate on schedules, merely time-points, the app has become useful for trip planning. At the beginning of the 2018 school year, buses were repainted to promote the GopherTrip service.

Audiovisual arrival boards are synced with NexTrip, Metro Transit's own real-time information service, and will announce and display only local buses who share stops. However, the app has no integration with Metro Transit's own app or offers information on any outside service. Sequentially, NexTrip cannot predict the arrival of Campus Shuttles.

References

External links
Parking and Transportation Services – Busing

Campus Shuttle
Bus transportation in Minnesota
Bus rapid transit in Minnesota
Transportation in Minneapolis–Saint Paul